Game Jackal is a PC application developed by Antiguan-based company SlySoft that allows users to play PC game titles without the need for the game's media to be in the CD-ROM or DVD-ROM drive. The program functions similar to a virtual drive; however, instead of making use of large disc images, Game Jackal uses a proprietary format which takes up considerably less storage space by working to only capture data the game requires to run.

Game Jackal is advertised to work with around 90% of games on the market, including games such as Sid Meier's Railroads!, Neverwinter Nights 2 and Need For Speed Carbon. While the authors admit not every title is bound to work with Game Jackal, support is gradually improving and regular updates which combat various bugs and blacklisting, as well as expanded functionality in the building of its profiles.

Game Jackal works by establishing a game profile which is used to store all of the game's relevant data. To begin, an original copy of the game is needed to allow Game Jackal to successfully 'capture' the game for use later. If a first attempt at capturing a profile does not succeed, it may be performed again: anything else Game Jackal picks up will simply be added to the profile.

Legality
The legality of the usage of Game Jackal is still constantly being discussed. Its authors claim that the program is completely within legal boundaries because:
The profiles are designed to be created from original copies of game CDs.
The profiles can not be publicly distributed.
The program does not modify any of the game's contents or data.

In January 2007, Jacal Consulting announced that Game Jackal would no longer be available for sale due to circumstances beyond their control. They subsequently closed the official website. According to several press releases, this was due to changes in Australian copyright legislation that came into effect on 1 January 2007.

Game Jackal was eventually acquired by SlySoft in March 2007, and a new version, dubbed 'SlySoft Game Jackal Pro', was released on 2 June 2007.

See also
 Copy Protection
 Backup
 End User License Agreement

External links
 Game Jackal Guide
 Game Jackal 2.0 Review

Video game emulation